Fidela Magpayo Reyes (October 29, 1920 – September 1, 2008), commonly known as Tiya Dely ("Aunt Dely"), was a Filipino radio broadcasting icon well-loved by generations of listeners and advice-seekers who tuned into her radio counselling programs. She was a pioneer radio broadcaster who debuted in the 1950s and was among the first wave of broadcasters who popularized Filipino music whilst American music still dominated the Philippine airwaves following the country's liberation from the United States.

Magpayo was also a popular newscaster, commentator, radio dramatist, writer, and producer during her time. She came to be recognized as the "First Lady of Philippine Radio" due to her long and outstanding service in the broadcasting industry.

Education
After World War II, Magpayo supported the presidential campaign of Manuel Roxas. When Roxas won the elections, he made the young supporter the confidential secretary to then-Vice President Elpidio Quirino. During his term as President after Roxas' death, Quirino encouraged Magpayo to study and get a college degree. She thus entered Far Eastern University and took up Foreign Service, but later shifted to another course. Magpayo graduated from FEU in 1950 with a degree in Political Science.

Career
Magpayo has worked in theater, radio, film, and television. Her career in broadcasting started when she was about 18 years old, after she joined radio comedians Andoy Balunbalunan and Dely Atay-Atayan as a group singer. She got her first counselling program on radio station DZRH on October 6, 1953. She eventually transferred to the López family-owned DZMM. Magpayo was also the last radio presenter heard on-air before DZXL was shut down after the imposition of Martial Law in September 1972, though not long after, she continued to host her program, this time over RPN's DWWW 630 kHz (now as the modern incarnation of DZMM), and she also became one of the anchors of the station during the Marcos era.

After Martial Law, Magpayo became the first-ever anchor of the then reopened DZMM 630, but after a few years, she transferred to DZRH. There, she continued radio shows until she had total airtime of nearly seven decades, rightfully earning the title "First Lady of Philippine Radio." Even as an octogenarian, she maintained a full work schedule at the station, hosting a nightly show Ang Inyong Tiya Dely ("Your Aunt Dely") apart from her usual weekend program.

Acting
Aside from being a radio personality, Magpayo also acted professionally and was a leading lady to Ángel Esmeralda, Pugo and Togo in several shows at the Manila Grand Opera House. She also acted in movies, most of which were produced by Sampaguita Pictures, LVN Pictures and Larry Santiago Productions. Among the films, she appeared in was Basahang Ginto ("Rag of gold") and Hinihintay Kita ("I await you").

Singing
She was also a singer, having recorded songs for Villar Records such as Pamaypay ng Maynila ("Hand fan of Manila"), Sa Ilalim ng Ilang-Ilang ("Beneath the Ylang-ylang"), Pandanggo ni Neneng ("Neneng's fandango"),"Paru-Parong Bukid" and Nabasag ang Banga ("The jar is broken").

Advocacy
Throughout her career, Magpayo pushed for educating people on the correct and proper usage of the Filipino language. She also worked for the preservation of traditional Filipino values of respect, honour, and love, which was evident whenever she gave advice to her listeners.

Death
At the age of 87, Magpayo was still a regular anchor of the DZRH radio program Serenata Kolektibista (now Serenata Filipina), in a segment that featured her longtime passions: kundiman and rondalla music. While anchoring said radio show on the evening of August 30, 2008, she suffered a stroke and was rushed to the Manila Doctors' Hospital. She died two days later on September 1, 2008, two months short of her 88th birthday.

Awards
The many awards Magpayo received for her contributions to the Philippine broadcast industry include the Pama-As Gintong Bai award from the National Commission for Culture and the Arts, and a Lifetime Achievement Award from the Kapisanan ng mga Brodkaster ng Pilipinas (KBP). In 2006, Magpayo was honored with the Gawad Plaridel Award by the University of the Philippines for keeping her dedication, integrity, and professionalism. She was supposed to receive the Gawad Saguisag Quezon award; instead, her relatives accepted the award in her place. The award pays tribute to her over 60 years in Philippine broadcasting.

Personal life
Magpayo was married to Colonel Leonor Reyes Sr. A veteran of Battle of Bataan and the Korean War. They had two daughters, Violeta and Delia, and a son, Leonor Jr.

Filmography

Radio
Serenata Kolektibista
Dear Tiya Dely
Kasaysayan sa mga Liham kay Tiya Dely

References

5. Outstanding radio personalities cited Inquirer.net, December 25, 1999 (retrieved on August 08, 2007).
6. Human Development Sector. Sulong Pilipina! Sulong Pilipinas! A Compilation of Filipino Women Centennial Awardees. National Centennial Commission -Women's Sector. Taft Avenue, Manila:1999.

1920 births
2008 deaths
Filipino radio personalities
Manila Broadcasting Company people
Far Eastern University alumni